Heinz-Dietrich Niess (born 19 March 1926) was a German ice hockey player. He competed in the men's tournament at the 1952 Winter Olympics.

References

External links
 
 

1926 births
Possibly living people
Olympic ice hockey players of Germany
Ice hockey players at the 1952 Winter Olympics
People from East Prussia
People from Kętrzyn
Sportspeople from Warmian-Masurian Voivodeship